Sir Keith Sinclair  (5 December 1922 – 20 June 1993) was a New Zealand poet and historian.

Academic career
Sinclair was the oldest child of Ernest Duncan Sinclair and Florence Pyrenes Kennedy. Born and raised in Auckland, Sinclair was a student at Auckland University College, which was then part of the University of New Zealand.  He was awarded a PhD at the College and was made a professor of history at the University of Auckland in 1963.

In 1966, Sinclair and fellow lecturer Bob Chapman established The University of Auckland Art Collection, beginning with the purchase of several paintings and drawings by Colin McCahon. The Collection is now managed by the Centre for Art Research, based at the Gus Fisher Gallery.

Sinclair won widespread acclaim for his first book of history, The Origins of the Maori Wars (1957). His next book, A History of New Zealand (1959), is often regarded as a classic in New Zealand history. The book remains in print, being revised several times, the last, with additions by fellow academic Raewyn Dalziel, in 2000. In 1967 he founded the New Zealand Journal of History.

In both his poetry and his work as a historian, Sinclair was a nationalist, in the sense that he was concerned with forging a national identity for New Zealand that was independent of its colonial origins.

Political life
In the 1969 general election he was the Labour Party candidate for Eden. He won the electorate on the night, but was defeated 3 weeks later on the final count (including special votes) by only 67 votes. Later he wrote an acclaimed biography of Labour Prime Minister Walter Nash who had left his vast personal archives at Sinclair's disposal. The book won the 1977 National Book Award.

Later life
In the 1983 Queen's Birthday Honours, Sinclair was appointed a Commander of the Order of the British Empire, for services to literature. Two years later, he was made a Knight Bachelor, for services to historical research and literature, in the 1985 Queen's Birthday Honours. He then taught history at the University of Auckland until his retirement in 1987. Halfway Round the Harbour, an autobiography, was published posthumously in 1993.

In 2003, the University of Auckland established the Keith Sinclair Chair in History in his honour. In 2005, he was named one of New Zealand's Top 100 History Makers.

One of his sons is the actor Harry Sinclair; another, Stephen, is a New Zealand playwright and poet.

Bibliography

History 
 1957: The Origins of the Maori Wars
 1959: A History of New Zealand
 1965: William Pember Reeves: New Zealand Fabian
 1967: The Liberal Government, 1891–1912: First Steps Towards a Welfare State
 1976: Walter Nash (1976)
 1982: A Soldier's View of Empire: the Reminiscences of James Bodell (as editor)
 1983: A History of the University of Auckland, Auckland University Press. 
 1986: A Destiny Apart: New Zealand's Search for a National Identity
 1990: The Oxford Illustrated History of New Zealand (as editor)
 1991: Kinds of Peace: Maori People After the Wars, 1870–85
 TVNZ Bateman New Zealand Encyclopaedia CD-ROM 2nd Edition

Poetry 
 1952: Songs for a Summer and Other Poems
 1954: Strangers or Beasts: Poems
 1963: A Time to Embrace
 1973: The Firewheel Tree
 1993: Moontalk

Other 
 The Reefs of Fire (1977) – a children's book

See also
 James Belich, inaugural holder of the Keith Sinclair Chair in History at the University of Auckland

References

External links
 Sinclair's entry in the 1966 Encyclopaedia of New Zealand on the origins of the Maori Wars.

1922 births
1993 deaths
20th-century New Zealand historians
New Zealand male poets
New Zealand biographers
Male biographers
University of Auckland alumni
Academic staff of the University of Auckland
People educated at Mount Albert Grammar School
New Zealand Knights Bachelor
New Zealand Commanders of the Order of the British Empire
New Zealand Labour Party politicians
Unsuccessful candidates in the 1969 New Zealand general election
20th-century New Zealand poets
20th-century New Zealand male writers
20th-century biographers
Keith